Mohammed Siraj (born 13 March 1994) is an Indian international cricketer who plays for the Indian national cricket team as a Right-arm fast medium bowler. He plays for Royal Challengers Bangalore in the Indian Premier League and Hyderabad in domestic cricket. As of February 2023, Siraj is currently ranked World No. 1 in the ICC men's ODI bowlers rankings.

Early life
Siraj was born on 13 March 1994 in Hyderabad. His father was an Auto-rickshaw driver, and his mother worked in other people's houses.

Domestic career
Siraj made his first-class debut on 15 November 2015 under the coaching of Karthik Udupa playing for Hyderabad in the 2015–16 Ranji Trophy tournament. He made his Twenty20 debut on 2 January 2016 in the 2015–16 Syed Mushtaq Ali Trophy tournament. During the 2016–17 Ranji Trophy tournament, he was the highest wicket-taker for Hyderabad with 41 wickets at an average of 18.92.

In February 2017, he was bought by the Sunrisers Hyderabad team for the 2017 Indian Premier League for 2.6 crores. In January 2018, he was bought by the Royal Challengers Bangalore in the 2018 IPL auction.

In February 2018, he was the leading wicket-taker in the 2017–18 Vijay Hazare Trophy, with 23 dismissals in seven matches. In October 2018, he was named in India A's squad for the 2018–19 Deodhar Trophy. In October 2019, he was named in India B's squad for the 2019–20 Deodhar Trophy.

On 21 October 2020, he became the first bowler in the history of Indian Premier League to bowl back to back maiden overs in a single match.

International career
In October 2017, he was named in India's Twenty20 International (T20I) squad for their series against New Zealand. He made his T20I debut for India against New Zealand on 4 November 2017, taking the wicket of Kane Williamson, finishing with figures of 1 wicket for 53 runs from four overs.

In February 2018, he was named in India's Twenty20 International (T20I) squad for the 2018 Nidahas Trophy. In September 2018, he was named in India's Test squad for their series against the West Indies, but he did not play. In December 2018, he was named in India's One Day International (ODI) squad for their series against Australia. He made his ODI debut against Australia at the Adelaide Oval on 15 January 2019.

On 26 October 2020, Siraj was named in India's Test squad for their series against Australia. After some deliberation to choose between Navdeep Saini and Siraj following an injury to Mohammad Shami, Siraj was chosen ahead of Saini, and he made his Test debut for India on 26 December 2020, against Australia.  His first Test wicket was of Marnus Labuschagne. In January 2021, during the fourth Test of the series against Australia, Siraj took his first five-wicket haul in Test cricket.

In January 2023, Siraj placed important role in the Ind vs NZ ODI series. He scored 4 wickets in the first ODI which helped the team to won the match for 12 runs.

On January 21, 2023 Siraj became No. 1 ODI Bowler in ICC ODI Rankings for Bowlers.

References

External links
 

1994 births
Living people
Indian cricketers
India Test cricketers
India One Day International cricketers
India Twenty20 International cricketers
Hyderabad cricketers
Indian A cricketers
India Green cricketers
Royal Challengers Bangalore cricketers
Sunrisers Hyderabad cricketers
Cricketers from Hyderabad, India